The Single European Railway Directive 2012 2012/34/EU is an EU Directive that regulates railway networks in European Union law. This recast the "First Railway Directive" or "Package" from 1991, and allows open access operations on railway lines by companies other than those that own the rail infrastructure. The legislation was extended by further directives to include cross border transit of freight.

In September 2010, the process of merging the directives into a single piece of legislation was begun, with the addition of modifications to strengthen the regulatory framework. The Second Railway Package, the Third Railway Package, and the Fourth Railway Package aim to push integration further.

Background
In many countries in Europe, the railway systems developed as separate privately owned companies operating regional networks with permission to construct and operate a line being granted or instructed by government legislation, or by royal decree or license. During the 20th century the railways became organised and run through a countrywide organisation often through nationalisation. These entities, in general, had total or virtual monopolies.

These national companies were vertically integrated organisations and it was difficult or impossible for private or regional enterprises to run their own trains on the national networks, or to compete in other EU countries' railway systems. Thus in 1991 EU Directive 91/440 was created to make it a legal requirement for independent companies to be able to apply for non-discriminatory track access (running powers) on a European Union country's track.

Description
The aims of the directive are to create a more efficient rail network by creating greater competition. To achieve this aim member states are required to ensure that organisations operating the infrastructure (track, signalling etc.), and those operating services (trains) are separate and run on a commercial basis. Additionally railway companies from all member states are allowed to run services on any other member states rail infrastructure, both for passenger transport and goods. The free competition provided by the mandate is optional for regional and urban passenger trains.

Further related legislation exists which applies to railway operations that are covered by directive 91/440:

Cross border freight in the EU
The directive was further clarified and extended by EU directive 2001/12 which initially allowed cross border freight operations on a network of tracks – to be called the Trans European Rail Freight Network a network which includes ports and freight terminals. The network on which traffic was allowed was to be extended to the whole European network. As a consequence of this new trans-national freight network an additional change was made to the original legislation which required train safety and operating standards to be set out clearly and administered by an organisation that did not run commercial services. The directive also required separate accounting of freight and passenger service revenues and costs.

Track allocation and access charges in the EU
EU directive 2001/14 set out the framework for the construction of bodies that control and regulate the allocation of line possessions to companies, and the charges for using the track, this directive replaced the previous legislation EU directive 95/19.

Licensing of railway companies in the EU
EU Directive 95/18 set out a framework and guidelines for the way in which countries of the EU provide licenses to operate to railway companies; a license provided in one member state is generally valid in all other member states. The directive was further clarified by EU Directive 2001/13 in 2001.

EU Directive 2004/51
EU Directive 2004/51 (part of the Second Railway Package) amended directive 91/440 to include reference to the Trans European Rail Freight Network, and future access by 2007 by licensed rail freight operators of all the European rail network as originally described in directive 2001/12.

Contents
The following summarises the Directive's contents:

art 1, management of infrastructure and rail, licensing, access charges
art 2, not for urban or regional services
art 3, definitions 
art 4, Independence of railway undertakings and infrastructure managers
art 5, Management of the railway undertakings according to commercial principles
art 6, separate accounts
art 7, independence of essential functions of an infrastructure manager
art 8, financing infrastructure, 5-year strategies, state funding
art 9(1) bailouts: 'Without prejudice to Union rules on State aid and in accordance with Articles 93, 107 and 108 TFEU, Member States shall set up appropriate mechanisms to help reduce the indebtedness of publicly owned or controlled railway undertakings to a level which does not impede sound financial management and which improves their financial situation.' 
art 10, Conditions of access to railway infrastructure (1) 'Railway undertakings shall be granted, under equitable, non-discriminatory and transparent conditions, the right to access to the railway infrastructure in all Member States for the purpose of operating all types of rail freight services.' (2) and passengers
art 11, limits on access rights
art 12, levy on railway undertakings doing passenger services
art 13(1) 'Infrastructure managers shall supply to all railway undertakings, in a non-discriminatory manner, the minimum access package laid down in point 1 of Annex II.' 
arts 14–15, cross border agreements, Commission monitoring
art 16, licensing authority in each member state
art 17–22, licensing requirements 
arts 23–25, license validity and procedure
arts 26–37, infrastructure access charging
arts 55–57, each MS should have a single regulator for rail, functions and cooperation
art 58, Procurement Directive 2004/17/EC 
arts 59–67, final
Annex I, list of infrastructure items
Annex II, in access, services to be supplied to railway undertakings 
Annex VI, requirements for costs and charges for access

Significance
Though the original directive was seen by some as a law bringing about privatisation of the railways, there are no requirements in the legislation requiring any level of privatisation. The main aim of the process was the "de-monopolisation" of European railways, with the aim of increasing competitiveness, a process referred to as 'liberalisation'.

There has also been a large increase in the number of private freight providers, many relatively small such as Rail4chem and ERS Railways, but the national companies still control the majority of the traffic. Deutsche Bahn has expanded considerably in the rail freight market, with the purchase of the freight section of the Dutch railway company NS (now DB Schenker Rail Nederland), EWS (UK), and DSB goods (Denmark) amongst others. The French state rail company SNCF also expanded through acquisitions, raising the possibility of trans-national virtual monopolies on rail freight replacing former national monopolies, or a potential duopoly between SNCF and Deutsche Bahn in most of western Europe.

A subsidiary of the British company DB Schenker Rail (UK), EuroCargoRail, operates trains in France and Spain, a situation unlikely prior to the liberalisation.

The increase in cross-border traffic has fuelled demand for multiple voltage electric locomotives such as Bombardier's TRAXX, Siemens's Eurosprinter and electric versions of Alstom's Prima locomotives series.

In passenger transport, large transport corporations have been created, or expanded into the rail market from other related activities such as FirstGroup, Veolia, Serco and Arriva.

In the UK, the directives have been criticised in some areas partly based on the problems with the full privatisation of British Rail, additionally the regulations favour competitive practice which are not necessarily compatible with workers rights.

Implementation
In the years following the introduction of the mandates different countries implemented them to different extents and at different paces. By 2004, some countries such as the United Kingdom had gone far beyond the original remit privatising the railway system on Great Britain (but not Northern Ireland), others such as Finland and France had created fully separate infrastructure and railway companies from the state-run enterprises; still others, such as Germany, had created separate subsidiaries for different service providers and subsidiaries for infrastructure and track (DB Netz). Yet others merely separated accounting between the two organisational sections. Most countries in the EU still have a state-owned infrastructure company, but many have privatised part or all of their service providers, or are working towards privatisation.

In June 2010, the European Commission instigated legal proceedings through the European Court of Justice against 13 states that had not fully implemented the set of directives (known as the 'first railway package'). The countries not having fully implemented the legislation to the commission's satisfaction were Austria, Czech Republic, Germany, Greece, France, Hungary, Ireland, Italy, Luxembourg, Poland, Portugal, Slovenia and Spain. In 2012 action against Germany and Austria on the basis that their infrastructure and operating companies were insufficiently separate was rejected by the European Court of Justice. Portugal, Spain and Hungary remained as having not yet fully complied with the aspects of the directives. Legal action against Bulgaria was passed to the Court of Justice in 2012 for non-implementation. In February 2013 the European Court of Justice ruled that the governments of Hungary and Spain had failed to liberalise their railways; infrastructure management was not sufficiently separated from train operation.

Ireland derogated its obligation to implement the legislation; until 2012 Iarnród Éireann train operations and infrastructure businesses remained unsplit, and a similar situation existed in Northern Ireland.

See also
Arrangements between railroads – arrangements in gaining track access in other countries
ERTMS – A pan-European signalling system being promoted by the EU.
EU Directive 2001/16 – standards for interoperability of rail systems. See: Directive 2001/16/EC of the European Parliament and of the Council 19 March 2001 Interoperability of conventional rail systems eur-lex.europa.eu
Second Railway Package, related legislation concerning primarily safety and interoperability
Third railway package
Fourth railway package

Notes

References

External links
Council Directive 91/440/EEC of 29 July 1991 on the development of the Community's railways Text of the directive 91/440 in all official European languages. eur-lex.europa.eu
Directive 2004/51/EC of the European Parliament and of the council of 29 April 2004 amending Council Directive 91/440/EEC on the development of the Community's railways Text of the directive 2004/51 in all official European languages. eur-lex.europa.eu
Implementation of EU directive 91/440 by country eur-lex.europa.eu
Development of the Community's railways Summary of legislation – (directives 91/440 and 2004/51) europa.eu
Licensing of railway undertakings Summary of legislation – (directives 2005/49, 95/18 and 2001/14) europa.eu
www.x-rail.org List of EU directives, legislation and white papers, general information on European railways. (including non-EU members) Non-affiliated.
National Railway Reform in Japan and the EU: Evaluation of Institutional changes Andrea Obermauer, Japan Railway and Transport Review 29, 12/2001 www.jrtr.net

Transport and the European Union
European Union directives
1991 in law
1991 in the European Economic Community
1991 in rail transport
Railway01